Jared Peniston (born August 28, 1982) is a Bermudian retired football player.

Career

Club
Peniston began his career with Dandy Town Hornets, and played for the team for six years in the Bermudian Premier Division before joining the Bermuda Hogges in the USL Second Division in 2007. He kept playing in Bermuda for North Village Rams and Dandy Town Hornets in the US off season before leaving them in summer 2011 for Wolves.

He retired in April 2013, after skippering Wolves to Bermudian Premier Division survival. He became an assistant to Wolves' coach Mark Jennings a season later.

International
He made his debut for Bermuda in a December 2003 friendly match against Barbados and earned a total of 6 caps, scoring no goals. He has represented his country in 9 FIFA World Cup qualification matches.

His final international match was an April 2004 friendly match against Nicaragua.

References

External links

1982 births
Living people
Association football midfielders
Bermudian footballers
Bermuda international footballers
Dandy Town Hornets F.C. players
Bermuda Hogges F.C. players
North Village Rams players
USL Second Division players
USL League Two players